Saint Marys is an unincorporated community in Butler Township, Franklin County, in the U.S. state of Indiana.

The community took its name from St. Mary's of the Rock Roman Catholic church located in the township near Pipe Creek along St. Mary's Road.

References

Unincorporated communities in Franklin County, Indiana
Unincorporated communities in Indiana